The John Pearce House is a historic house in Albuquerque, New Mexico. It is notable for its architecture and as the only extant house on the Downtown section of Central Avenue, which is otherwise occupied entirely by commercial buildings. The house was built in 1905 by Dr. John F. Pearce (c. 1859–1937), one of the city's first physicians. The contractor, Wallace Hesselden, also built the Henry Mann House the same year. After Pearce moved out of the house in 1933, it was used for various functions including a boarding house and chiropractic clinic. In 1982, the house was renovated and converted to office space. The architect for the renovation was Antoine Predock. The property was added to the New Mexico State Register of Cultural Properties and the National Register of Historic Places in 1980. It is next door to another historic structure, the Skinner Building.

The house is a two-and-a-half-story building generally adhering to the American Foursquare design, with a rectangular plan, a pyramidal hipped roof with dormers on three sides, and a full-width porch. The ground floor and porch columns are faced with dark-colored clinker brick, while the second floor is stuccoed with half-timbering reminiscent of the Tudor Revival style. Both of these wall treatments are unusual for Albuquerque. The clinker brick was also used to build a wall and walkway in front of the house.

References

Houses in Albuquerque, New Mexico
Houses on the National Register of Historic Places in New Mexico
New Mexico State Register of Cultural Properties
National Register of Historic Places in Albuquerque, New Mexico
Houses completed in 1905
American Foursquare architecture
U.S. Route 66 in New Mexico